Alexander Gordon Penn (May 10, 1799 – May 7, 1866) was a U.S. Representative from Louisiana.

Born near Stella, Virginia, Penn moved with his parents to Lexington, Kentucky; he then completed preparatory studies and attended Emory and Henry College, Marion, Virginia.  Later he moved to the parish of St. Tammany, Louisiana, in 1821 and engaged in planting near Covington.  He served in the State house of representatives.
Postmaster of New Orleans from December 19, 1843, to April 18, 1849.
He served as delegate to the Democratic National Conventions in 1844, 1852, 1856, and 1860.

Penn was elected as a Democrat to the Thirty-first Congress to fill the vacancy caused by the death of John H. Harmanson.
He was reelected to the Thirty-second Congress and served from December 30, 1850, to March 3, 1853.
He served as chairman of the Committee on Expenditures in the Post Office Department (Thirty-second Congress).
He returned to St. Tammany Parish and engaged in planting and the operation of a lumber mill near Covington.

At the conclusion of the Civil War, Penn returned to Washington, D.C. He died there on May 7, 1866, and was interred in Glenwood Cemetery.

References

Bibliography

1799 births
1866 deaths
Emory and Henry College alumni
Burials at Glenwood Cemetery (Washington, D.C.)
People from Patrick County, Virginia
Democratic Party members of the United States House of Representatives from Louisiana
Louisiana postmasters
Democratic Party members of the Louisiana House of Representatives
19th-century American politicians